

Events
Guilhem Figueira wrote the sirventes contra Roma (actually entitled D'un sirventes far), attacking the Papacy while he was in Toulouse besieged by the Albigensian Crusade
Joan d'Aubusson, a Ghibelline at the court of Emperor Frederick II, praises the bond between the emperor and Boniface II of Montferrat in verse.

Births

Deaths

13th-century poetry
Poetry